Glitz is a 1985 novel by author Elmore Leonard, following the story of Detective Vincent Mora who is being stalked by Teddy Magyk, the serial rapist he put away. It was made into a 1988 television film starring Jimmy Smits and Markie Post.

Storyline 
Psycho mama's boy Teddy Magyk has become obsessed with the Miami cop who put him away for raping a senior citizen — but he wants to hit Vincent Mora where it really hurts before killing him. So when a beautiful Puerto Rican hooker takes a swan dive from an Atlantic City high-rise and Vincent naturally shows up to investigate the questionable death of his "special friend," Teddy figures he's got his prey just where he wants him. But the A.C. dazzle is blinding the Magic Man to a couple of very hard truths: Vincent Mora doesn't forgive and forget ... and he doesn't die easy.

Characters in Glitz
Vincent Mora – Miami homicide investigator
Teddy Magyk – crazy serial rapist
Iris Ruiz – young tragic hooker
Lorendo Paz – Puerto Rico criminal affairs investigator
Linda Moon – lounge singer who becomes Vincent's girlfriend during the story
Dixie Davies – Atlantic City major crime squad homicide officer
Tommy Donovan – Atlantic City casino owner
Nancy Donovan, casino manager who becomes enamoured of Vincent
Jacky Garbo – Atlantic City casino operator
Sal Catalina – Atlantic City wise guy
Ricky Catalina, a.k.a. "the Zit" – collector
LaDonna Padgett – Jacky's girlfriend and former Miss Oklahoma
Frank Cingoro – wise guy
DeLeon Johnson, a.k.a. "Moose" – Ex-NFL player, working as minder for Jacky

Critical reception
Writing in The New York Times in 1985, horror fiction writer Stephen King compared the novel favorably with works by John D. MacDonald,  Raymond Chandler and Dashiell Hammett.

Film

In the 1988 film version for cable television, the Atlantic City detective Vincent Mora was played by Jimmy Smits, the villain Teddy Magyk by John Diehl and the lounge singer Linda Moon by Markie Post.  It was directed by Sandor Stern.

References

External links 
 Glitz at Elmore Leonard.com
 

1985 American novels
American novels adapted into films
Novels by Elmore Leonard
American novels adapted into television shows